Koukolná is a village in Karviná District, Moravian-Silesian Region, Czech Republic. It was first mentioned in 1447 and was a separate municipality, but became administratively a part of Dětmarovice in years 1872–1875. It has an area of 1,78 km2, and in 2001 it had a population of 243.

Footnotes 

Villages in Karviná District
Neighbourhoods in the Czech Republic